The Children's Hospital Classic was a golf tournament on the Nationwide Tour. It was played annually at the Black Creek Club in Chattanooga, Tennessee and produced by Friends of the Festival Event Management from 2007 to 2011. From 2003 to 2010 the event was called the Chattanooga Classic.

The 2011 purse was $500,000, with $90,000 going to the winner.

Winners

Bolded golfers graduated to the PGA Tour via the final Nationwide Tour money list.

See also
Chattanooga Classic (PGA Tour), a PGA Tour event played from 1983 to 1992

External links
PGATOUR.com Tournament website

Former Korn Ferry Tour events
Golf in Tennessee
Sports in Chattanooga, Tennessee
Recurring sporting events established in 2003
Recurring sporting events disestablished in 2011
2003 establishments in Tennessee
2011 disestablishments in Tennessee